Rene Pais (born 25 March 1988), better known by his stage name Syn Cole is an Estonian DJ and record producer.

Syn Cole started out on Avicii LE7ELS record label and management. His singles and remixes have amassed over 1 billion total streams on Youtube and Spotify. Syn Cole has also released music on record labels Universal, Sony, Warner, Spinnin' Records, Ultra Records, NCS and Martin Garrix STMPD RCRDS. He has played at the festivals Tomorrowland, Creamfields, EDC Las Vegas, Ultra Miami. In addition, clubs Ushuaia Ibiza, XS Las Vegas, Exchange LA and others.

Syn Cole kicked off his remix duties with Avicii "Silhouettes", which became his first BBC Radio 1 spotlight. As of February 2022 the remix has over 162 million streams on Spotify. His second Avicii remix "Hey Brother" received both radio and DJ support across the globe. First vocal single Miami 82 (with remixes from Avicii and Kygo) reached Top 10 US Billboard Club Play chart and Top 20 on the Billboard Dance Chart. Billboard Magazine included it in the 10 Best Electronic/Dance songs of 2014. In 2018 it was soundtracked for Sprite’s TV commercial featuring BLACKPINK. Syn Cole released "Feel Good" via NCS record label in 2016. In 2017 a new version "Got The Feeling" was released via Sony/RCA, featuring kirstin from Pentatonix. The single "Who You Are" reached 4th spot on the Billboard Club songs chart in 2018. His vocal single "It's You" was soundtracked for 2017 feature films 47 Meters Down and Reality High.

Discography

Singles

Remixes

References

External links
 

1988 births
Living people
Estonian DJs
Estonian house musicians
People from Pärnu
NoCopyrightSounds artists
Stmpd Rcrds artists